Vexillum antonellii is a species of small sea snail, marine gastropod mollusk in the family Costellariidae, the ribbed miters.

Description
The length of the shell attains 27 mm.

The color of the shell is chocolate- or chestnut-brown, or dark gray, white-tinged or banded above.

Distribution
This marine species occurs off the Philippines and Timor

References

 Turner H. 2001. Katalog der Familie Costellariidae Macdonald, 1860. Conchbooks. 1–100 page(s): 17

External links
  Dohrn, H. (1860). Description of new species of Mitra from the collection of Hugh Cuming, Esq. Proceedings of the Zoological Society of London. 28: 366-368
  Cernohorsky, Walter Oliver. The Mitridae of Fiji; The veliger vol. 8 (1965)

antonellii
Gastropods described in 1860